Argileonis, mother of the Spartan officer Brasidas, who fought in the Peloponnesian War.

When the ambassadors from Amphipolis brought the news of Brasidas's death, Argileonis asked if he had behaved bravely; and on their speaking of him in reply as the best of the Spartans, answered that the strangers were in error; Brasidas was a brave man, but there were many better in Sparta. The answer became famous, and Argileonis is said to have been rewarded for it by the ephors.

Notes

Ancient Spartan women
5th-century BC Spartans
People of the Peloponnesian War
5th-century BC Greek women